Pen y Gaer (or Pen-y-gaer) is the location of a Bronze Age and Iron Age hillfort near the village of Llanbedr-y-Cennin in the Conwy valley, Wales.

A natural defensive site, it had a long history of occupation, indicated by the complexity of the defences, which were amended over time.  There are two Bronze Age cairns on the north-west slope, and extensive prehistoric and later field systemsare nearby.  The remains as seen today are mostly of Iron Age origin, but further earthworks, probably of medieval origin, lie on the south-eastern slopes.

The remains of the two walls of stone can be seen, as can those of a chevaux-de-frise.  The entrance is to the west, and access can be gained from a car park, reached by the road from the village.

See also
 List of hillforts in Wales

External links
 Royal Commission site, with photos
 A BBC page

Caerhun
Archaeological sites in Conwy County Borough
Hillforts in Conwy County Borough
Mountains and hills of Conwy County Borough
Archaeological sites in Snowdonia
Hillforts in Snowdonia
Mountains and hills of Snowdonia
Iron Age Britain